(French) or  (Dutch), is one of the 19 municipalities of the Brussels-Capital Region, Belgium. Located in the southern part of the region, it is bordered by Anderlecht, Ixelles, Uccle, and Saint-Gilles, as well as the Flemish municipality of Drogenbos. In common with all of Brussels' municipalities, it is legally bilingual (French–Dutch).

The municipality is commonly known for Forest National/Vorst Nationaal concert hall. It also houses an important jail, an Audi factory and a railway depot that is home to the Belgian fleet of Eurostar train sets.

Etymology
The first inhabitants named their village , which was likely based on the Old Dutch word , meaning "forest" of the "prince". This likely found its origin in the Latin name , meaning "private forest".

History

Frankish origins and medieval period
The first houses built in this forested area along the Geleysbeek, a tributary of the river Senne, date from the 7th century. The village's first church was dedicated to Saint Dionysius the Areopagite. The legend of Saint Alena, a young convert to Chalcedonian Christianity murdered by her father's troops for hearing mass at the church of Dionysius, also takes place in the 7th century. The chapel and cult of Saint Alena, however, date only from the 12th century. The saint's cenotaph, one of the rare examples of 12th-century sculpture in Belgium, can still be admired in the chapel today. The contiguous Church of St. Denis (Dionysius) was rebuilt in the Romanesque style at around the same time.

The abbots of Affligem, which had been the ecclesiastical owners of the parish since the bishop of Cambrai ceded it to them in 1105, decided to build a priory for women in Forest; Forest Abbey. The first abbess of the Forest priory was appointed in 1239. Also in the 13th century, the Romanesque Church of St. Denis was rebuilt in the newer Gothic style. The neighbouring abbatial church was rebuilt in the 15th century.

17th century until today
During the period of the Austrian Netherlands, especially during the reigns of Archdukes Albert and Isabella, Forest prospered, thanks to the Abbey. On 26 March 1764, however, a devastating fire ruined some of the buildings and destroyed many of its artworks. Three decades later, in the years following the French Revolution, the religious community was disbanded, the nuns forced to flee, and the buildings sold. The municipality bought the Abbey in 1964 and proceeded to restore it to its former glory.

Sights
 The Church of St. Denis and the adjoining Chapel of St. Alena house unique specimens of Romanesque sculpture. The nearby Benedictine abbey is now home to a cultural centre.
 The Art Deco Municipal Hall, built in 1925 and inaugurated in 1938, is located near the old historic centre.
 The Church of St. Augustine on the / (a square named due to its altitude one hundred meters above sea level), also in Art Deco style.
 The Wiels contemporary art centre, housed in the old Wielemans-Ceuppens brewery.
 Villa Beau-Site, a striking example of Art Nouveau in Brussels
 Finally, the municipality maintains several green areas, including Duden Park and the aptly named Forest/Vorst Park.

Events and folklore
 The Forest National/Vorst Nationaal concert hall is well known in the world of show business, arts and culture, as one of the prime venues for international star performances.
 On the grounds of Forest Abbey, a three-day-long "Medieval Celebration" is organised in September, where hosts and visitors alike are dressed as knights, burghers, soldiers, and a variety of other medieval attire. Typical activities include watching assorted magicians, jugglers and fire-eaters, listening to musicians perform on period instruments, appreciating old-time crafts, and tasting forgotten drinks and dishes.
 Since 1987, Forest has giant puppets of its own; Nele and Pauline, both baptised at the Abbey, and their children, Alida and Paville.

Famous inhabitants

 Jean Delville (1867–1953), symbolist painter, writer, and occultist
 Raymond Goethals (1921–2004), football coach
 Stuart Merrill (1863–1915), American symbolist poet
 Louise Ochsé (1884–1944), sculptor
 Paul Vanden Boeynants (1919–2001), politician, Minister of Defence and Prime Minister
 Eugène Ysaÿe (1858–1931), virtuoso violinist, composer, and conductor

International relations

Twin towns and sister cities
Forest is twinned with:
  Courbevoie, France

References

Notes

External links

 Official website 
 Forest National 

 
Municipalities of the Brussels-Capital Region
Populated places in Belgium